Judeo-Marathi (Marathi: जुदाव मराठी) is a form of Marathi spoken by the Bene Israel, a Jewish ethnic group that developed a unique identity in India. Judæo-Marathi is, like Standard Marathi, written in the Devanagari script. It may not be sufficiently different from Marathi as to constitute a distinct language, although it is characterized by a number of loanwords from Hebrew and Aramaic as a result of influence from the Cochin Jewish community, Judæo-Malayalam and Portuguese and also some influence from the Urdu language. It has some linguistic features in common with various Jewish languages, developed by Jewish communities in widely disparate places in times, which are also variants of a local language with loanwords from Hebrew and Aramaic.

The Judæo-Marathi community mainly resides in Raigad and Thane districts and the city of Mumbai in Maharashtra. The majority of its members have immigrated to Israel, and most of the rest live in England and Canada. Recently, a rare Marathi-Hebrew text titled Poona Haggadah, was found in Manchester. The 137-year-old book, which was used by the Bene-Israel community, was discovered by a University of Manchester historian, Yaakov Wise.

See also 
 Judeo-Urdu

References

External links
 a blog about Bene-Israel

Jewish languages
Jews and Judaism in India
Jews and Judaism in Pakistan
Marathi language
Bene Israel